{{Infobox musical artist
| name         = Remy Zero
| image        = 180px-Remy Zero.jpg
| caption      = Remy Zero, L-R: Jeffrey Cain, Shelby Tate, Gregory Slay, Cinjun Tate, Cedric LeMoyne
| image_size   = 240
| alias        =
| origin       = Birmingham, Alabama, US
| genre        = 
| years_active = 1989–2003, 2010
| label        = 
| spinoffs     = Spartan Fidelity
| spinoff_of   = 
| website      = 
| past_members = Gregory SlayAugust Cinjun TateShelby TateJeffrey CainCedric LeMoyneLouis Schefano<ref>{{cite web|title=Video premiere: Cheshires (ex-Remy Zero), 'Love This Feelin |url=http://buzzbands.la/2016/08/11/video-premiere-cheshires-remy-zero-love-this-feelin/ |website=buzzbands.la |date=August 11, 2016 |access-date=November 18, 2019}}</ref>
}}

Remy Zero was an American alternative rock band from Birmingham, Alabama, formed in 1989. It was composed of August Cinjun Tate (vocals, guitar), Shelby Tate (guitar, vocals, keyboards), Cedric LeMoyne (bass), Jeffrey Cain (guitar, vocals), and Louis Schefano (drums), who was later replaced by Gregory Slay (drums, percussion).

History
Before Remy Zero had released any full-length albums, Radiohead found their demo tape and invited them to be part of the US tour for The Bends. After that, Remy Zero moved from Alabama to Los Angeles to record their first album.

The self-titled record received little recognition or sales. The subsequent album, Villa Elaine, generated some acclaim. Villa Elaine was recorded when the band was living in an apartment of the same name in Hollywood. Remy Zero's third album, The Golden Hum, was also received well. A 50-second version of the song "Save Me" from The Golden Hum was used as the theme song for WB/CW's Smallville during its ten-season run. The band's music was also featured on KCRW's Morning Becomes Eclectic radio show. The song "Shattered" was used in the films Crazy/Beautiful and Suicide Kings. "Fair", from Villa Elaine, was used in the films Garden State and Fanboys, "Prophecy" in She's All That and The Last Kiss, "Gramarye" appeared in Stigmata, and "Temenos (Here Come the Shakes)" played in the film The Chamber. Additionally, "Perfect Memory" played during the film The Invisible and the last episode of Smallville's first season. Remy Zero recorded a version of Art Garfunkel's song "Bright Eyes" for the 2002 charity album For the Kids.

The band broke up after making The Golden Hum and many of its members went on to join new bands. Shelby and Cinjun created Spartan Fidelity, Cain joined Isidore and later created Dead Snares; LeMoyne toured with Alanis Morissette's band before joining O+S and later Rose of the West. Gregory Slay created Sleepwell.

Drummer Gregory Slay died on January 1, 2010, aged 40, of complications from cystic fibrosis.

On May 22, 2010, Remy Zero played their first show together in eight years as a tribute to Gregory in New Orleans, the town where he was born.
This was followed by the release of the new single Til the End" on the label Popantipop, on September 7, 2010.
From October 7 to 12, 2010, Remy Zero performed in memory of their drummer at venues including Dante's in Portland, Oregon, The Crocodile Cafe in Seattle, Cafe Du Nord in San Francisco, and in Spaceland in Los Angeles. The band's Twitter account confirmed that these shows would be the final word from the band.

On October 18, 2011, Gregory Slay's final solo album, released under the moniker Horsethief Beats, titled The Sound Will Find You, featured Remy Zero bandmates Jeffrey Cain and Cedric Lemoyne and was published on the Communicating Vessels label. Jeffrey Cain is now a member of the Australian band The Church, best known for their 1988 hit song "Under the Milky Way".

Cinjun Tate composed the music for Amy Jo Johnson's 2017 movie The Space Between''.

In 2020, a mostly new studio recording featuring Shelby Tate and Cinjun Tate was released digitally under the name Zero Brothers.

Band members
 August Cinjun Tate – vocals, guitar
 Shelby Tate – guitar, vocals, keyboards
 Jeffrey Cain – guitar
 Cedric LeMoyne – bass
 Louis Schefano – drums (1989–1996)
 Gregory Slay – drums (c. 1996–2003)

Touring
 Leslie Van Trease – guitar, keyboards
 Chip Kilpatrick – drums (2010)

Timeline

Discography

Studio albums

EPs

Singles

References

External links
 
 Save Me from My Half-Life Drive Documentary
 Remy Zero interview, October 10, 2010

Alternative rock groups from Alabama
American post-grunge musical groups
Musical groups established in 1989
Musical groups disestablished in 2003
Musical groups from Birmingham, Alabama
Capitol Records artists
DGC Records artists
Warner Music Group artists
Elektra Records artists